Chiltern can refer to the following places:

In England:
 Chiltern Hills, an area of Outstanding Natural Beauty, known locally as "the Chilterns"
 Chiltern District, a local government district in Buckinghamshire named after the hills
 Chiltern Open Air Museum, an open-air museum in the same hills
 Chiltern Hundreds, ancient administrative area lying partially in the Chiltern Hills
 Crown Steward and Bailiff of the three Chiltern Hundreds of Stoke, Desborough and Burnham, a political appointment
 Chiltern Main Line, an important railway line, that runs through the Chiltern Hills
 Chiltern Railways, the company that operates the line
 Chiltern Radio Network, a group of radio stations based in Dunstable
 Heart Dunstable, one of the stations in that group, previously known as "Chiltern Radio"

In Australia:
 Chiltern, Victoria, a town near Rutherglen

Miscellaneous
Chiltern Court, building above Baker Street tube station, London

See also
Chilton (disambiguation)